Daniel José Bamberg (born 23 April 1984 in São Lourenço do Oeste) is a Brazilian footballer who plays as a midfielder for Icelandic Premier League side Breiðablik.

Career

Club
In February 2016, Bamberg signed a one-year contract with Icelandic Úrvalsdeild side Breiðablik UBK.

Career statistics

External links
Daniel Bamberg's Haugesund profile

References

1984 births
Living people
Brazilian footballers
Brazilian people of Austrian descent
Brazilian people of German descent
Association football midfielders
Associação Portuguesa de Desportos players
Fortaleza Esporte Clube players
GAIS players
ABC Futebol Clube players
IFK Norrköping players
FK Haugesund players
Örebro SK players
Allsvenskan players
Superettan players
Eliteserien players
Úrvalsdeild karla (football) players
Brazilian expatriate footballers
Expatriate footballers in Sweden
Expatriate footballers in Norway
Expatriate footballers in Iceland
Brazilian expatriate sportspeople in Sweden
Brazilian expatriate sportspeople in Norway
Brazilian expatriate sportspeople in Iceland
Breiðablik UBK players